Sharon Pardo (born 17 February 1971) is an Israeli Professor of International Relations and a Jean Monnet Chair ad personam in  European Studies at Ben-Gurion University of the Negev.

Biography 
Pardo was born in Haifa. He received his  LL.B. (1996) and his  LL.M. (1997) from the University of Sheffield's School of Law, and his  Ph.D. (2003) from Ghent University, Faculty of Political and Social Studies. His doctoral thesis dealt with “The Euro-Mediterranean Partnership: From European Unilateralism to Regional Regime.”

Pardo is a senior researcher at The Simone Veil Research Centre for Contemporary European Studies – The National Jean Monnet Centre of Excellence at Ben-Gurion University of the Negev (BGU).

Pardo served as the chairperson of the Department of Politics and Government at BGU from 2016 to 2018. He is a senior adjunct fellow at the National Centre for Research on Europe (NCRE), University of Canterbury, New Zealand, and a member of the board of the Israeli Association for International Studies (IAIS).

Pardo is a member of the board of the Israel Council on Foreign Relations (ICFR), a member of the International Advisory Council of the Konrad Adenauer Foundation, and a Member of the Israel Bar Association. He is the co-editor of Europe and the World book series by Lexington Books.

Selected bibliography 
 Uneasy Neighbors: Israel and the European Union (with Joel Peters). Lexington Books, Lanham MD 2010, 
 Israel and the European Union: A Documentary History (with Joel Peters). Lexington Books, Lanham MD 2012, 
 Normative Power Europe Meets Israel: Perceptions and Realities. Lexington Books, Lanham MD 2015, 
 The Jewish Contribution to European Integration (with Hila Zahavi). Lexington Books, Lanham MD 2019,

Notes

External links 
Personal Website
Curriculum Vitae, 2018
 When Europe Spoke Out on the Mideast (with Yonatan Touval), International Herald Tribune, 8 June 2010
 What does Israel think about the European Union?, European Council on Foreign Relations, 18 August 2016

1971 births
Living people
International relations scholars